Radin! is a 2016 French comedy film directed by Fred Cavayé. It stars Dany Boon, Laurence Arné, Noémie Schmidt and Patrick Ridremont.

Cast 
 Dany Boon as François Gautier 
 Laurence Arné as Valérie
 Noémie Schmidt as Laura 
 Patrick Ridremont as Cédric
 Christophe Canard as Gilles
 Christophe Favre as Demeester
 Karina Marimon as Carole
 Sébastien Chabal as himself

Release 
Radin! was released in France on 28 September 2016, where it topped the box office during its opening week with 1,002,709 entries.

Reception
The Hollywood Reporter found that the film provided "a handful of decent laughs" but it "ultimately runs out of comic steam about midway through" and that "the third-act twist that makes it all happen is one of the easiest, lamest screenwriting tools in the book."

References

External links 
 

2016 films
2016 comedy films
2010s French-language films
French comedy films
Films directed by Fred Cavayé
Films scored by Klaus Badelt
2010s French films